Besnik Bisha (born 1958) is an Albanian film director and actor. He has directed five films since 1988. His 2007 film Mao Tse Tung was entered into the 30th Moscow International Film Festival.

Selected filmography
 Bolero (1997)
 Mao Tse Tung (2007)

References

External links

1958 births
Living people
Albanian film directors
Albanian male film actors
People from Tirana